KakaoTV is a South Korean OTT streaming television, personal internet broadcasting and video player service owned by Kakao Entertainment that launched on June 16, 2015.

History
On June 16, 2015, KakaoTV was officially released. Initially, it was a website similar to Naver TV in the way that it offered the streaming broadcasts from affiliated or contracted broadcasters.

On November 6, 2015, Kakao launched the "KakaoTV Live Open Chat" function which links KakaoTV's live broadcasts and Kakao Talk's open chat, allowing viewers to chat while streaming a program.

On February 18, 2017, Daum tvPot was integrated with KakaoTV. In 2017, KakaoTV attracted only 1.8% of streaming video viewers according to a survey of 7,426 online video streaming users.

On September 1, 2020, Kakao M (now Kakao Entertainment M Company) expanded the service area of KakaoTV to OTT as it needed a platform to distribute its own dramas, entertainment programs and films. It accumulated 13 million views one week after its launch, 58 million views after a month and 106 million views after three months. Most content is in average 20-minutes long and some are created in vertical form for mobile users.

Original programming

Drama

Entertainment

Film

Live shows

References

External links
 Official website

Kakao
Kakao M
2015 establishments in South Korea
Internet television streaming services